Sansbury is a surname. Notable people with the surname include:

Eddie Sansbury (born 1983), Australian rules footballer
Kenneth Sansbury (1905–1993), British Anglican bishop
Tauto Sansbury (1949–2019), Australian activist

See also
Sainsbury (disambiguation)